Girl is the second studio album by American country music singer Maren Morris, released on March 8, 2019 through Columbia Nashville. It was preceded by the single "Girl”. The promotional single "Common", featuring Brandi Carlile, was released alongside the album pre-order on February 8. The track was later nominated for Best Country Duo/Group Performance at the 62nd Annual Grammy Awards, while the album's second single "The Bones" was nominated for Best Country Song at the 63rd Annual Grammy Awards. Morris embarked on the Girl: The World Tour in support of the album.

Release and promotion
The album's lead single "Girl" was released on January 18, 2019, and was described as "an upbeat, optimistic single with a strutting, indie-rock guitar sound". The album's first promotional single "Common" features Brandi Carlile and was released on February 8. The collaboration was nominated for Best Country Duo/Group Performance at the 62nd Annual Grammy Awards. "The Bones" was released on February 22 as the second and final promotional single of the album. On August 16, 2019, the song was sent to radios as the second single from the album. It peaked at number 12 on the Billboard Hot 100, becoming Morris' highest charting solo single to date, as well as hitting number one on the Country Airplay chart of February 2020, becoming Maren’s third number one for that chart. The song went on to earn a nomination for Best Country Song at the 63rd Annual Grammy Awards. Maren later teased fans on social media that from having another consecutive hit, that the album will be having another single. In March 2020 she released "To Hell & Back" as the third single from the album.

In support of the album, Morris embarked on Girl: The World Tour, which began on March 9 and concluded on November 16, 2019.

Critical reception

Girl received generally positive reviews from music critics. At Metacritic, which assigns a normalized rating out of 100 to reviews from mainstream critics, the album received an average score of 66, based on 8 reviews.

Melissa Novacaska from Exclaim! said, "What's impressive about Girl though is how strong Morris's vocals have grown, along with the maturity and uniqueness of each song. It's clear that Girl isn't a sophomore slump, but rather an album worth investing in." AllMusic's Stephen Thomas Erlewine called Girl "bright, shiny, and big, an album designed to appeal to any imaginable audience", noting how Morris goes for a "pan-cultural pop" soundscape that draws from different genres and delivers straightforward messages that's backed by equally strong production. He concluded by finding criticism in the album's songwriting following that musical direction, "By foregrounding her lyrical intent and offering no room for interpretation, Morris winds up with songs that feel less imaginative than their execution, a flaw that is by no means fatal but does mean that Girl plays on a smaller scale than intended."

Rolling Stone editor Rob Sheffield felt that fans of Morris's "scrappy attitude on Hero" will be oft-put by the "happy midtempo love songs" found in the album's second half but said that tracks like "All My Favorite People", "Flavor" and "Make Out with Me" will satisfy them, concluding that, "She might be on her best behavior on this LP, but the liveliest moments come when she gets out of line." Laura Snapes of The Guardian felt the record goes for "neither gutsy grandstanding nor Vegas-adjacent pop" throughout its track listing, criticizing the "biographical sincerity ("Great Ones", "Gold Love", "Make Out with Me")" for lacking conviction and the misuse of Morris's "compellingly hardbitten voice" on songs that don't involve fractured romances, saying that Morris should take inspiration from fellow country artist Kacey Musgraves when recording her third album.

Awards and nominations

Commercial performance
Girl debuted and peaked at number four on the US Billboard 200 with 46,000 album-equivalent units, of which 25,000 were pure album sales in its first week. It is Morris' second US top-five album. The album broke the record for the largest streaming week ever for a country studio album by a woman, with approximately 24 million streams in its first week. On February 26, 2020, the album was certified gold by the Recording Industry Association of America (RIAA) for combined sales and album-equivalent units of over 500,000 units. The album has sold 91,000 in traditional albums, and has earned at least 636,000 equivalent album units as of April 2020.

Track listing
Credits adapted from Tidal.

Personnel
Credits adapted from liner notes.

Musicians

 Charlie Bisharat – violin
 Jacob Braum – cello
 busbee – percussion, programming, bass guitar, keyboards, piano, Hammond B-3 organ, synthesizer, electric guitar
 Brandi Carlile – duet vocals (track 5)
 Kathleen Edwards – background vocals (track 13)
 Alma Fernandez – viola
 Ian Fitchuk – piano, Hammond B-3 organ, synthesizer, percussion
 Natalie Hemby – background vocals (track 14)
 Ryan Hurd – background vocals (tracks 3, 9, 12)
 Greg Kurstin – drums, percussion, bass guitar, piano, keyboards, synthesizer, organ, omnichord
 Songa Lee – violin
 Rob Moose – violin, viola, octave viola
 Maren Morris – lead vocals, background vocals
 John Osborne – electric guitar
 T.J. Osborne – duet vocals (track 3)
 Aaron Sterling – drums, percussion, programming
 Laura Veltz – background vocals (tracks 4, 11, 12)
 Patrick Warren – string arrangement (tracks 7, 13)
 Derek Wells – acoustic guitar, electric guitar, mandolin
 Ben West – Hammond B-3 organ, synthesizer

Technical

 Julian Burg – recording
 busbee – producer (all tracks except 1, 5, 12), recording, mixing
 Maren Morris – producer (all tracks except 1, 5, 12)
 Dave Clauss – digital editing, recording, mixing
 Michael Freeman – assistant engineer
 Mike "Frog" Griffith – production coordination
 Greg Kurstin – producer (tracks 1, 5, 12), recording, mixing
 Rachel Kurstin – production coordination
 Randy Merrill – mastering
 Rob Moose – recording
 Maren Morris – producer
 Zack Pancoast – assistant engineer
 Alex Pasco – recording
 Nathan Spicer – recording
 Mark "Spike" Stent – mixing
 Matt Tuggle – production assistant (track 5 only)
 Brian David Willis – digital editing

Imagery

 Marwa Bashir – hair
 Samuel Burgess-Johnson – Maren Morris font design
 Joseph Cassell – styling
 Tracy Fleaner – creative director
 Nicki Fletcher – cover design
 Jamie Nelson – photography
 Lorrie Turk – makeup

Charts

Weekly charts

Year-end charts

Certifications

Release history

References

2019 albums
Maren Morris albums
Columbia Records albums
Albums produced by busbee